Prof. Volodymyr Kostyantynovych Vysokovych, or (in more usual transcription) Vladimir Konstantinovich Vysokovich(1854–1912), the Head of the Department of Pathologic Anatomy at Medical Faculty of St. Volodymyr Kyiv University, one of the founders of the Society of Struggle with Infectious Diseases and Kyiv Bacteriological Institute.

References

Ukrainian microbiologists
Academic staff of the Taras Shevchenko National University of Kyiv
National University of Kharkiv alumni
1912 deaths
1854 births